Park Jung-bae (박정배, 朴廷培, born April 1, 1982) was South Korean professional baseball pitcher for the SK Wyverns of the KBO League.

External links
Career statistics and player information from Korea Baseball Organization 

SSG Landers players
Doosan Bears players
KBO League pitchers
South Korean expatriate baseball players in Australia
Hanyang University alumni
People from Gongju
1982 births
Living people
Sportspeople from South Chungcheong Province